Idia laurentii, the laurentine idia, is a litter moth of the family Erebidae. The species was first described by J. B. Smith in 1893. It is found in the US from central New York, south to the mountains of North Carolina.

There is one generation per year.

Larvae have been reared on dead leaves of cherry.

References

"Idia laurentii - (Smith, 1893)" NatureServe Explorer. Retrieved January 27, 2020.

Herminiinae
Moths of North America
Moths described in 1893